Nemo Rangers Hurling & Football Club is a Cork-based Gaelic Athletic Association club on the southside of Cork city, Ireland.  The club was founded in 1922 and is involved in Gaelic football, hurling, Ladies football and Camogie.

History
Nemo Rangers Hurling & Football Club was founded in 1922 following the amalgamation of two Cork clubs – Nemo and Rangers.  Within six years the new club made their mark by winning the county Intermediate Hurling and Football Championships in 1928, a feat that has never been equalled. 
Since then Nemo have become notable as a football club, having won seven All-Ireland club football titles. Nemo have established close links with nearby secondary school, Coláiste Chríost Rí.

Notable players

Footballers
 Billy Morgan
 Dinny Allen
 Frank Cogan
 Jimmy Barrett
 Brian Murphy
 James Masters
 Colin Corkery
 Jimmy Kerrigan
 Tony Nation
 Mickey Niblock
 Derek Kavanagh
 Joe Kavanagh
 Martin Cronin
 Steven O'Brien
 Shea Fahy
 Ephie Fitzgerald

Hurlers
 Brian Murphy

Players of other sports
 Chiedozie Ogbene, whose substitute appearance for the Republic of Ireland national football team against Hungary in June 2021 made him the first African-born player to represent Ireland at senior level in that sport. He scored 1–2 in an under-21 final for Nemo Rangers in 2015.

Honours

Football
All-Ireland Senior Club Football Championships: 7
 1973, 1979, 1982, 1984, 1989, 1994, 2003
Munster Senior Club Football Championships: 17
 1972, 1974, 1975, 1978, 1981, 1983, 1987, 1988, 1993, 2000, 2001, 2002, 2005, 2007, 2010, 2017, 2019 
Cork Senior Football Championships: 23
 1972, 1974, 1975, 1977, 1978, 1981, 1983, 1987, 1988, 1993, 2000, 2001, 2002, 2005, 2006, 2007, 2008, 2010, 20152017 2019, 2020, 2022
Cork Intermediate Football Championships: 5
 1928, 1980, 2001, 2002, 2004
Cork Junior Football Championships: 1
 1957
Cork Under-21 Football Championships: 14
 1974, 1975, 1979, 1980, 1988, 1989, 1991, 2001, 2002, 2004, 2005, 2012, 2014, 2018
Cork Minor Football Championships: 11
 1954, 1955, 1957, 1970, 1972, 1989, 1990, 1991, 1999, 2005, 2016
 Cork City Junior Football Championship 9
 1957, 1967, 1979, 1990, 1995, 1996, 1999, 2002, 2007
City (Seandun Division) Under-21 Football Championships
 1974, 1975, 1979, 1980, 1988, 1989, 1991, 2001, 2002, 2004, 2005, 2011, 2012, 2013, 2014

Hurling
 Cork Intermediate Hurling Championships: 3
 1918, 1928, 1971 Runners-up 2005
 Cork Junior Hurling Championships: 1
 2000
 Cork Minor Hurling Championships: 2
 1955, 1970
 Cork Under-21 B Hurling Championships: 0
Runner-up 2012
 Cork City Junior Hurling Championship 11
 1960, 1961, 1962, 1963, 1964, 1991, 1994, 1998, 2000, 2007, 2009  
  Runners-up 1989, 1993, 2013

References

External links

 
Gaelic games clubs in County Cork
Gaelic football clubs in County Cork
Hurling clubs in County Cork